The Qom Seminary is the largest Islamic seminary (hawza) in Iran, established in 1922 by Grand Ayatollah Abdul-Karim Haeri Yazdi in Qom. It trains Usuli scholars.

History

Although big Shi'a academies existed in Qom dating back as early as 10th century CE, the hawza of the city became prominent at the time of the Safavids when Shi'a Islam became the official religion of Iran. The famous teachers of that era included Mulla Sadra and Shaykh Bahai. The modern Qom hawza was revitalized by Abdul Karim Haeri Yazdi and Grand Ayatollah Borujerdi and is barely a century old. There are nearly three hundred thousand clerics in Iran’s seminaries. Grand Ayatollah Hossein Vahid Khorasani currently heads the Qom Seminary.

Law school
Because Sharia is legally binding in Iran, the Qom seminary also functions as a law school in Iran. Ebrahim Raisi, the former Chief Justice of the Islamic republic of  Iran, is one of the more prominent alumni of the Qom seminary.

All judges in the Islamic Republic of Iran must have received education in Islamic Law; most qadis are "members of the group of ruling clergies."

Notable teachers

See also
Fatima Masumeh Shrine
Society of Seminary Teachers of Qom
Hawza Najaf
Marjaʿ
Lists of Maraji
Isfahan Seminary

References

External links

Official website
Exposition of Hawzah and International Arena kicks off in Qom

Islamic seminaries and theological colleges
Islam in Iran
Hawza
Buildings and structures in Qom
Education in Qom Province
Single-gender schools
Islamic terminology
Islamic education
Islamic education in Iran
Islamic schools
Seminaries and theological colleges in Iran
Qom Seminary
Law schools in Iran